Sam Brody Jenner (born August 21, 1983) is an American television personality, model and disc jockey. He was born and raised in Los Angeles, California. In 2005, Jenner appeared in the reality television series, The Princes of Malibu, which additionally featured his older brother, musician Brandon Jenner, and his former best friend, Spencer Pratt.

In 2007, he began dating Lauren Conrad, a primary cast member of The Hills, and subsequently came to prominence after being cast in the series during the second season. Their brief relationship ultimately ended his friendship with Pratt. The following year, Jenner was commissioned in his own spin-off series, Bromance, in which he was intended to find another companion in Pratt's absence. However, it was canceled after its inaugural season after receiving underwhelming ratings.

In 2009, Conrad left The Hills to pursue other career opportunities and was replaced by Jenner's ex-girlfriend, Kristin Cavallari. Their rekindled relationship became the central focus of the series until its conclusion the following year. In 2013, Jenner returned to reality television, appearing on Keeping Up with the Kardashians during its eighth season, which featured: his parent Caitlyn Jenner and his stepmother Kris Jenner; his step-siblings, Kourtney, Kim, Khloé, and Rob Kardashian; and his half-sisters, Kendall and Kylie Jenner.

Early life and education
Sam Brody Jenner was born in Los Angeles, California, on August 21, 1983, to reality television personality and retired Olympics champion Caitlyn Jenner and actress Linda Thompson. He is the half-brother to Burton "Burt" and Cassandra "Casey" Jenner through Caitlyn's marriage to Chrystie Crownover, which lasted from 1972 until 1981. Jenner is the younger brother of Brandon Jenner, also a reality television personality.

After Jenner's parents divorced in 1985, Caitlyn Jenner married Kris Kardashian, the ex-wife of attorney Robert Kardashian, in 1991. Consequently, Jenner became a stepbrother to Kourtney, Kim, Khloé, and Rob Kardashian. Kris gave birth to his half-sisters Kendall and Kylie Jenner in 1995 and 1997, respectively.

Reality television career
In 1991 Jenner's mother  Linda Thompson remarried to composer and record producer, David Foster. In 2005, Thompson, Foster, the Jenner brothers and their friend Spencer Pratt starred in the reality television series, The Princes of Malibu. However, the series was cancelled soon after its premiere when Thompson filed for divorce from Foster.

In 2006, MTV developed the reality television series, The Hills as the spin-off of Laguna Beach: The Real Orange County. It originally chronicled the lives of Lauren Conrad, who had appeared on its predecessor, her housemate Heidi Montag, and friends Audrina Patridge and Whitney Port. In 2007, Jenner began dating Conrad, which led to the deterioration of his friendship with Pratt. After Conrad established relationships with Jenner and Frankie Delgado, Pratt severed ties with both men.

In 2009, Jenner hosted and executive produced his own reality show, Bromance, in which young men competed to become part of his entourage. Jenner has modelled for Guess clothing, Agent Provocateur underwear, OP and the magazine Cosmogirl.

Personal life
In 2016, he proposed to girlfriend Kaitlynn Carter in Indonesia. They had an intimate ceremony in Bali in 2018. Neither Brody's parent Caitlyn Jenner, nor his best friend Spencer Pratt were in attendance. In 2019, the couple appeared together on The Hills: New Beginnings where they confirmed that they were not legally married in the US. In 2019, they separated after five years together. Jenner announced in January 2023 that he was expecting a baby with his girlfriend Tia Blanco.

Filmography

References

External links

1983 births
Male models from California
American socialites
Crossroads School alumni
Brody
Kardashian family
Living people
Participants in American reality television series
People from Hollywood, Los Angeles
Television personalities from California
The Hills (TV series)
Models from Los Angeles